Smocza Jama (Polish for "dragon's den") is a limestone cave in the Wawel Hill in Kraków. Owing to its location in the heart of the former Polish capital and its connection to the legendary Wawel Dragon, it is the best known cave in Poland.

Morphology 
Smocza Jama has two entrances, one natural and one artificial — a 19th-century waterwork well. They are connected by three large chambers. A side passage, discovered in 1974, leads under the St. Stanislaus and St. Wenceslaus's Cathedral. In the underground pools lives a rare crustacean troglobiont, Niphargus tatrensis, relict of the Tertiary sea fauna.

Smocza Jama has a length of 276 m and a vertical range of 15 m.

History 
13th century Bishop of Kraków Wincenty Kadłubek wrote in his Chronica seu originale regum et principum Poloniae that:

Smocza Jama was first mentioned on the turn of the 12th century in Wincenty Kadłubek's Chronica Polonorum, which is also the source of the first known version of the Wawel Dragon legend, later further developed by Jan Długosz and Marcin Bielski. The name of the cave was first given in 1551 in Marcin Bielski's Kronika wszystkiego świata.

In the 16th and 17th century, an infamous public house had been operating at the entrance to the cave and inside. It served as an inspiration for poets such as Jan Andrzej Morsztyn.

In the 18th century, Wawel was fortified. Inside the cave, supporting pillars were raised under the walls, and its main entrance was bricked up. Two remaining smaller openings were bricked up in 1830. The cave has been reopened in 1842 and made accessible to the general public. In 1972, a fire-breathing statue of the Wawel Dragon by Bronisław Chromy has been erected at the entrance to the cave.

See also 
 Culture of Kraków

External links 

 Smocza Jama  – with a map

Wawel
Limestone caves
Show caves in Poland
Caves of Poland
Tourist attractions in Kraków
Polish folklore